Karel Vosátka (born November 20, 1929) is a former pair skater who competed for Czechoslovakia. With skating partner Blažena Knittlová, he is the 1948 European silver medalist.

Personal life 
Vosátka was born on November 20, 1929, in Plzeň. He married Romanian figure skater Cristina Patraulea in 1963 and emigrated to Canada in 1975. Vosátka has coached in Romania (1961–64); Gottwaldov (Zlín), Czechoslovakia; Switzerland (1968–1974); France (1974–1975), and Montreal, Quebec, Canada. He has coached for several years with her wife for CPA Stellaire and CPA Fantasia in Baie-Comeau, Quebec, Canada. His son, Robin Vosatka (born September 8, 1965), finished 4th in pair skating at the 1981 Canadian Championships.

Career 
Early in his career, Vosátka competed in partnership with Blažena Knittlová. They were awarded the silver medal at the 1948 European Championships in Prague. The pair withdrew from the 1948 Winter Olympics in St. Moritz. Their partnership ended in 1953. Vosátka teamed up with Věra Vajsábelová and then Hana Dvořáková. Dvořáková/Vosátka competed at five European Championships, achieving their best result, 5th, in 1960. He retired from competition in 1961, following the crash of Sabena Flight 548 and cancellation of the World Championships in Prague.

Results

With Knittlová

With Vajsábelová

With Dvořáková

References

Czech emigrants to Canada
Czech male pair skaters
Czechoslovak male pair skaters
Olympic figure skaters of Czechoslovakia
Figure skaters at the 1948 Winter Olympics
1929 births
Living people
European Figure Skating Championships medalists
Sportspeople from Plzeň